The 2020 Penn State Nittany Lions men's soccer team represented Pennsylvania State University during the 2020 NCAA Division I men's soccer season and the 2020 Big Ten Conference men's soccer season. As a result of the COVID-19 pandemic, the 2020 fall season was postponed to the spring, and began on February 19, 2021. It was the program's 108th season fielding a men's varsity soccer team, and their 30th season in the Big Ten Conference. The 2020 season is Jeff Cook's third year at the helm.

Background 
The 2020 season is the Nittany Lions' 108th season as a varsity soccer program, and their 30th season playing in the Big Ten Conference. The team is led by third year head coach, Jeff Cook, who had previously served as an assistant coach for the professional soccer team, Bethlehem Steel of USL Championship.

Player movement

Departures 

{| class="wikitable sortable"  style="text-align:center; font-size:90%; "
! style=""| Name
! style=""| Number
! style=""| Position
! style=""| Height
! style=""| Weight
! style=""| Year
! style=""| Hometown
! class="unsortable" style=""| Reason for departure
|-
|align="left"|  || 3 ||  ||  || 175 ||  || Reading, PA ||align="left"| Drafted by Orlando City SC with the 22nd pick of the 2021 MLS SuperDraft.
|-
|align="left"|  || 8 ||  ||  || 165 ||  || Dublin, Ireland ||align="left"| Graduated; drafted by Portland Timbers with the 16th pick of the 2020 MLS SuperDraft.
|-
|align="left"|  || 20 ||  ||  || 178 ||  || Wallingford, PA ||align="left"| Graduated
|-
|align="left"|  || 23 ||  ||  || 165 ||  || New Hyde Park, NY ||align="left"| Graduated
|-
|align="left"|  || 24 ||  ||  || 170 ||  || Reading, PA ||align="left"| Graduated

Arrivals 

{| class="wikitable" style="font-size:90%;" border="1"
!style=""| Name
!style=""| Nat.
!style=""| Hometown
!style=""| High School
!style=""| Club
!style=""| TDS Rating
|-
| ||||Newport Beach, CA||||Pateadores SC||
|-
| ||||Philadelphia, PA||||Tampa Bay Rowdies||  
|-
| ||||Philadelphia, PA||||Philadelphia Union Academy||  
|-
| ||||Dulaney, MD||||Baltimore Armour||  
|-
| ||||Belle Mead, NJ||||PDA (Academy)||  
|-

Transfers

2021 MLS SuperDraft

Squad

Roster

Personnel
{|class="wikitable"
|-
! style="" scope="col" colspan="2"|Front office
|-

|-
! style="" scope="col" colspan="2"|Coaching staff
|-

Schedule 

|-
!colspan=8 style=""| Regular season
|-

|-
!colspan=8 style=""| Big Ten Tournament
|-

|-
!colspan=8 style=""| NCAA Tournament
|-

Source:Penn State Athletics

Rankings

Preseason Big Ten poll
Penn State was predicted to finish 3rd in the Big Ten Conference.

Season Rankings

Statistics

Top scorers
{| class="wikitable" style="font-size: 95%; text-align: center;"
|-
!style="" |Rank
!style="" |Position
!style="" |Number
!style="" |Name
!style="" |Total
|-
|rowspan="1"|1
|FW
|9
|align="left"| Daniel Bloyou
|8
|-
|rowspan="1"|2
|MF
|8
|align="left"| Peter Mangione
|6
|-
|rowspan="1"|3
|MF
|11
|align="left"| Pierre Reedy
|5
|-

Top assists
{| class="wikitable" style="font-size: 95%; text-align: center;"
|-
!style="" |Rank
!style="" |Position
!style="" |Number
!style="" |Name
!style="" |Total
|-
|rowspan="1"|1
|MF
|8
|align="left"| Peter Mangione
|6
|-
|rowspan="1"|T-2
|MF
|11
|align="left"| Pierre Reedy
|4
|-
|rowspan="1"|T-2
|FW
|10
|align="left"| Seth Kuhn
|4
|-
|rowspan="1"|3
|DF
|18
|align="left"| Alex Stevenson
|3
|-

Honors and awards

Big Ten awards

{| class="wikitable" style="font-size: 95%; text-align: center;"
|-
!style="" |Award
!style="" |Name
|-
|All-Big Ten First Team
|align="left"| Daniel Bloyou
|-
|All-Big Ten First Team
|align="left"| Pierre Reedy
|-
|All-Big Ten Second Team
|align="left"| Seth Kuhn
|-
|All-Big Ten Second Team
|align="left"| Kris Shakes
|-
|All-Big Ten Freshman Team
|align="left"| Peter Mangione
|-
|Big Ten Sportsmanship Award Honorees
|align="left"| Nicholas Rieple
|-

Top Drawer Soccer awards
{| class="wikitable" style="font-size: 95%; text-align: center;"
!style="" colspan="2"|All-American Team
|-
!style="background:#eaecf0;" |Award
!style="background:#eaecf0;" |Name
|-
|3rd Team
|align="left"| Pierre Reedy
|-
|3rd Team
|align="left"| Daniel Bloyou
|-
!style="" colspan="2"|Freshman Best XI Team
|-
!style="background:#eaecf0;" |Award
!style="background:#eaecf0;" |Name
|-
|2nd Team
|align="left"| Peter Mangione
|-
!style="" colspan="2"|All-North Region
|-
!style="background:#eaecf0;" |Award
!style="background:#eaecf0;" |Name
|-
|1st Team
|align="left"| Pierre Reedy
|-
|1st Team
|align="left"| Daniel Bloyou
|-
|1st Team
|align="left"| Brandon Hackenberg
|-
|2nd Team
|align="left"| Peter Mangione
|-
!style="" colspan="2"|Team of the Week
|-
!style="background:#eaecf0;" |Week
!style="background:#eaecf0;" |Name
|-
|May 4
|align="left"| Peter Mangione
|-
|April 13
|align="left"| Daniel Bloyou
|-
|March 30
|align="left"| Brandon Hackenberg
|-
|March 30
|align="left"| Brandon Hackenberg
|-
|March 23
|align="left"| Daniel Bloyou
|-
!style="" colspan="2"|Preseason Best XI
|-
!style="background:#eaecf0;" |Position
!style="background:#eaecf0;" |Name
|-
|FW
|align="left"| Liam Butts
|-
|DF
|align="left"| Brandon Hackenberg
|-

United Soccer Coaches awards

{| class="wikitable" style="font-size: 95%; text-align: center;"
|-
!style="" colspan="2"|Scholar All-American
|-
!style="background:#eaecf0;" |Award
!style="background:#eaecf0;" |Name
|-
|First Team
|align="left"| Pierre Reedy
|-
|First Team
|align="left"| Brandon Hackenberg
|-
|Second Team
|align="left"| Seth Kuhn
|-

References

External links 
 PSU Soccer Schedule

2020
Penn State Nittany Lions
Penn State Nittany Lions
Penn State Nittany Lions men's soccer
Penn State